Corridor V may refer to:
Corridor V (Appalachian Development Highway System)
Corridor V (Pan-European corridor)